Nathdwara Painting refers to a painting tradition and school of artists that emerged in Nathdwara, a city in Rajsamand district in the Western state of Rajasthan in India. Nathdwara paintings are of different sub-styles of which Pichhwai paintings are the most popular.  The word Pichwai derives from the Sanskrit words pich meaning back and wais meaning hanging. These paintings are cloth paintings hung behind the image of the Hindu god Shrinathji.

Origin and area
The Nathdwara school is a subset of the Mewar school of painting and is seen as an important school in the 17th and 18th century miniature paintings. The sub-styles of Mewar painting include Udaigarh, Devgarh and Nathdwara as important centers of miniature production. The temple of Shrinathji is believed to have provided a boost to the art activities in the town. It is recorded that to avoid the oppression of the iconoclast Mughal emperor Aurangzeb, the image of Shrinathji, a child manifestation of Krishna was installed in Nathdwara in 1670 by Goswami priests from Mathura. After this, many artists, including the famous Acharya Gopinathji, motivated by religious fervor came and created paintings of Srinathji.

Pichhwai are intricate paintings which portray Lord Krishna. They exist in the holy town of Nathdwara in the Rajasthan state of India.

Krishna is shown in different moods, body postures, and attire more commonly found on a cloth or paper. It is a very ancient form of art passed on from generation to generation and it has a very devotional theme towards Lord Krishna.

The purpose of Pichhwais, other than its artistic appeal, is to narrate tales of Krishna to the illiterate. They have become the main export of Nathdwara and are in much demand among foreign visitors in the area.

These artists mostly live in Chitron ki gali (Street of paintings) and Chitrakaron ka mohallah (colony of painters) and make a close community with constant interaction. It is no wonder that many times a Pichhwai painting is a group effort, where several skillful painters work together under the supervision of a master artist.

Themes
Most works produced in this style revolve around the figure of Shrinathji as a manifestation of Krishna and refer to the incident of him holding the Govardhan hill on his last finger. Each pichwai painting is considered a seva or an offering to the deity and hence personifies Shrinathji as a prince with jewels and luxuries, surrounded by the milkmaids, gopis. These seva themes are based on different seasons and paintings are made to depict different moods of the season. There are also paintings that show the Lord in different costumes celebrating different festivals. Other themes like Mata Yashoda, Nandlal and Balgopal figures are also painted in this style. Some of the paintings are gem-encrusted.

See also
 Pichwai Paintings
 Rajput painting
Pichhwai
 Banke Bihari Pichwai Gold Painting

References

Schools of Indian painting
Rajsamand district
Rajasthani arts
Nathdwara